The women's 63 kilograms event at the 2014 Asian Games took place on 23 September 2014 at Moonlight Festival Garden Weightlifting Venue in Incheon, South Korea.

Schedule
All times are Korea Standard Time (UTC+09:00)

Records

Results 
Legend
NM — No mark

New records
The following records were established during the competition.

References

External links
 Official website

Weightlifting at the 2014 Asian Games